Bacchisa basalis is a species of beetle in the family Cerambycidae. It was described by Gahan in 1894. It is known from China, Hong Kong and Vietnam.

References

Bacchisa
Beetles described in 1894
Beetles of Asia